This is a list of singers from Iceland.



A
Ólafur Arnalds
Ólöf Arnalds
Ásgeir

B
Ragnar Bjarnason,  Raggi Bjarna
Björk
Hera Björk
Sjonni Brink

D
 Daði Freyr
 Friðrik Dór

E
Eivør (Eivør Pálsdóttir) (Faroese but well-recognized in Iceland)
Emmsjé Gauti

G
Ragnheiður Gröndal
Jóhanna Guðrún
Eyþór Ingi Gunnlaugsson

H
Björgvin Halldórsson
Hafdís Huld
Hilmar Örn Hilmarsson

J
Jófríður Ákadóttir
Jónsi
Jón Jónsson
Júníus Meyvant (Unnar Gísli Sigurmundsson)

L
Lay Low
Leoncie
Low Roar
Laufey (singer)

M
Megas (Magnús Þór Jónsson)
Bubbi Morthens
Mugison

O
Paul Oscar

P
Prins Póló
Pascal Pinon

S
Jónas Sigurðsson
Snorri Snorrason
Sóley
Greta Salóme
Svala

T
Ásgeir Trausti
Emilíana Torrini

V
Hildur Vala
Vilhjálmur Hólmar Vilhjálmsson

Á
Ásgeir Trausti a.k.a. Ásgeir
Magni Ásgeirsson

Ö
Arnbjörg Auður Örnólfsdóttir

See also
 List of Icelandic visual artists
 List of Icelandic writers
 List of bands from Iceland

Singers
 
Iceland
Iceland